El Pantanillo is a village and municipality in San Luis Province in western Argentina.

References

Populated places in San Luis Province